

Roche Harbor Airport  is a private airport located one nautical mile (2 km) northeast of the central business district of Roche Harbor, in San Juan County, Washington, United States. It was formerly a public use airport (FAA ID: 9S1). The 9S1 location identifier has been reassigned to Four Winds Airport in Celina, Texas.

Facilities 
Roche Harbor Airport resides at elevation of 100 feet (30 m) above mean sea level. It has one runway designated 7/25 with an asphalt surface measuring 3,593 by 30 feet (1,095 x 9 m).

Airline and destinations

See also 
 Roche Harbor Seaplane Base

References

External links 
 Roche Harbor Airport at WSDOT Airport Directory
 Roche Harbor Airport Web Cam
 Aerial image as of July 1990 from USGS The National Map

Airports in Washington (state)
Airports in San Juan County, Washington